Copycat Singers was a Swedish musical gameshow broadcast by TV3 in late 2011. Each episode featured a well-known Swedish singer and five 'copycats'. The show's only season featured Lasse Berghagen, Pernilla Wahlgren, Nanne Grönvall, Markoolio, Tommy Nilsson, Caroline af Ugglas, Christer Sandelin and Shirley Clamp.

Swedish game shows